Wolfhurst is a census-designated place (CDP) in Belmont County, Ohio, United States. It is part of the Wheeling, West Virginia Metropolitan Statistical Area. The population was 1,239 at the 2010 census.

Geography
Wolfhurst is located in eastern Belmont County at  (40.028736, -80.815811), in the valley of Wheeling Creek. U.S. Route 40, the National Road, passes through the center of Wolfhurst, leading east  to downtown Wheeling, West Virginia.

Demographics

References

Census-designated places in Belmont County, Ohio